Minervarya rufescens (common names: Malabar wart frog, reddish burrowing frog, or rufescent burrowing frog) is a species of frog that is endemic to the Western Ghats, India. It occurs in Maharashtra, Karnataka, Goa, and Kerala states. It is a locally common species associated with riparian and forest edge habitats in open and lightly degraded tropical moist semi-evergreen forests.

References

External links

rufescens
Frogs of India
Endemic fauna of the Western Ghats
Amphibians described in 1854
Taxobox binomials not recognized by IUCN